Slave of Dreams is a 1995 television film based on the story of Joseph in the Bible, directed by Robert M. Young, produced by Dino De Laurentiis and Martha De Laurentiis and written by Ron Hutchinson. The film stars Adrian Pasdar as Joseph, Sherilyn Fenn as Zulaikha and Edward James Olmos as Potiphar.

Cast
 Edward James Olmos as Potiphar
 Sherilyn Fenn as Zulaikha
 Adrian Pasdar as Joseph
 Philip Newman as Nakht
 Nadia Sawalha as Ankh
 Nabil Shaban as Soothsayer
 Orso Maria Guerrini as Pharaoh
 Nevork Malikyan as Pharaoh's Adviser
 Anthony Samuel Selby as Etham
 Emanuele Carucci as Raneb

See also
List of historical drama films

External links
 

1995 films
Films based on the Book of Genesis
Cultural depictions of Joseph (Genesis)
Films set in ancient Egypt
Films directed by Robert M. Young
Films produced by Dino De Laurentiis
Films scored by Christopher Tyng
1990s English-language films